This is a list of schools in Kingston upon Hull in the East Riding of Yorkshire, England.

State-funded schools

Primary schools

Adelaide Primary School
Ainthorpe Primary School
Alderman Cogan's CE Primary School
Appleton Primary School
Bellfield Primary School
Biggin Hill Primary School
Bricknell Primary School
Broadacre Primary School
Buckingham Primary Academy
Bude Park Primary School
Cavendish Primary School
Chiltern Primary School
Christopher Pickering Primary School
Cleeve Primary School
Clifton Primary School
Collingwood Primary School
Craven Primary Academy
Dorchester Primary School
Eastfield Primary School
Endike Academy
Endsleigh Holy Child RC Academy
Estcourt Primary Academy
Francis Askew Primary School
Gillshill Primary School
The Green Way Academy
Griffin Primary School
Hall Road Academy
Highlands Primary School
Ings Primary School
Kingswood Parks Primary School
Longhill Primary School
Marfleet Primary Academy
Maybury Primary School
Mersey Primary Academy
Mountbatten Primary School
Neasden Primary School
Newington Academy
Newland St John's CE Academy
Oldfleet Primary School
Paisley Primary School
The Parks Primary Academy
Parkstone Primary School
Pearson Primary School
Priory Primary School
Rokeby Park Primary School
St Andrew's CE Primary School
St Anthony's RC Academy
St Charles' RC Academy
St George's Primary School
St James' CE Academy
St Mary Queen of Martyrs RC Academy
St Nicholas Primary School
St Richard's RC Academy
St Thomas More RC Academy
St Vincent's RC Academy
Sidmouth Primary School
Southcoates Primary Academy
Spring Cottage Primary School
Stepney Primary School
Stockwell Academy
Stoneferry Primary School
Sutton Park Primary School
Thanet Primary School
Thoresby Primary School
Thorpepark Academy
Victoria Dock Primary School
Wansbeck Primary School
Westcott Primary School
Wheeler Primary School
Wold Academy
Woodland Primary School

Secondary schools

Archbishop Sentamu Academy
The Boulevard Academy
Hull Trinity House Academy
Kelvin Hall School
Kingswood Academy
Malet Lambert School
The Marvell College
Newland School for Girls
Ron Dearing UTC
St Mary's College
Sirius Academy North
Sirius Academy West
Winifred Holtby Academy

Special and alternative schools

Aspire Academy
Bridgeview Special School
The Compass Academy
Euler Academy
Frederick Holmes School
Ganton School
Northcott School
Oakfield
Rise Academy
The Sullivan Centre
Tweendykes School
The Venn Boulevard Centre
Whitehouse Pupil Referral Unit

Further education
Endeavour Learning and Skills Centre
Hull College
Wilberforce College
Wyke College

Independent schools

Primary and preparatory schools
Froebel House School

Senior and all-through schools
Hymers College

References 

Hull
 
Schools
Schools